A spinning wheel is a device for spinning thread or yarn. 

Spinning wheel may also refer to:
"Spinning Wheel" (song), a song by the band Blood, Sweat & Tears
Spinning Wheel (film), a 1984 Chinese film
Spinning wheel (animation), a type of throbber in computer graphics
Spinning Wheel (Asheville, North Carolina), a historic building

See also
"Spinning the Wheel", a 1996 song by George Michael
Spinning Wheels station (PAAC), a rail station
The Spinning Wheel of Omphale, a symphonic poem by Saint-Saëns
The Golden Spinning Wheel (Dvořák), a symphonic poem by Dvořák
Spinning pinwheel, a computer mouse pointer busy symbol